The 2020–21 season is Sheffield Wednesday's ninth consecutive season in the Championship. The season covers the period from 1 July 2020 to 30 June 2021.

Season overview

July
On 31 July, Wednesday received a 12-point penalty for breaching the League's Profitability and Sustainability Rules for the three season reporting period ending in 2017–18, with the penalty taking effect for the 2020–21 season.

August
On 12 August, the club restructured their coaching setup with James Beattie coming in as assistant manager, Darryl Flahavan as the goalkeeper coach and Andrew Hughes as first team coach.

On 14 August,  Lee Bullen and Nicky Weaver left the first team to work with the academy.

On 17 August, Wednesday announced they would be appealing the 12 point penalty, with a verdict not expected until later in the year.

October
On 7 October, it was revealed that owner Dejphon Chansiri was securing debt against the clubs Hillsborough Stadium.

November
On 4 November, their 12-point penalty was reduced to 6 points following discussions with the League Arbitration Panel.

On 9 November, Garry Monk and his staff had their contracts terminated after 3 wins from their opening 11 games

On 13 November, experienced manager Tony Pulis would be appointed the new manager, 

On 18 November, Pulis would bring in Craig Gardner as his first team coach.

On 20 November, Pulis would bring in Mike Trusson as his assistant manager

December
On 17 December, it was announced that the players were not paid in full for the month of November, the second time this has happened in 2020. 

On 28 December, Tony Pulis would be relieved of his duties after 10 games in charge, picking up 7 points from a possible 30 and just one win. The chairman would also say "there are also other issues which have had a bearing on this decision." First team coach Neil Thompson would be placed in charge in a caretaker role.

January
On 7 January, while Neil Thompson was in caretaker charge, himself with assistants Lee Bullen and Steve Haslam would be affected with COVID-19, meaning they would miss their FA Cup third round clash with Exeter City. Academy coach Andy Holdsworth, assisted by Daral Pugh, Nicky Weaver and Tony Strudwick would take charge of the game.

On 13 January, the clubs next two league games against Coventry City and Wycombe Wanderers were suspended following other positive COVID-19 tests.

On 31 January, it was announce that the players were not paid again for the month of January, with news that salaries were capped at £7,000 per month.

February
On 8 February, it was leaked that Spanish entrepreneur and former advisor to the club, Erik Alonso had an offer to buy the club rejected by Dejphon Chansiri. The offer was rumoured to be between £25m - £30m and backed by a wealthy Indonesian consortium.

March
On 1 March, Darren Moore was appointed the first team manager and the third permanent manager of the season, leaving his position at Doncaster Rovers. He would be joined by Jamie Smith as his assistant manager and Paul Williams as his first team coach.

On 9 March, the club published the club's annual accounts for the year ending 31 July 2019.

April
On 2 April, prior to the game against Watford it was announced manager Darren Moore wouldn't be in the dugout due to a positive COVID-19 test. 

On 15 April, after Darren Moore's return to the dugout, he would suffer a setback in his recovery, developing pneumonia as a result of COVID-19. 

On 26 April, Owls youngster Will Trueman would win the prestigious LFE Championship Apprentice of the Year award.

May
On 8 May, Darren Moore would return to the dugout for the crucial end of season game against Derby County. The game would see Wednesday, after 9 years in the Championship, relegated back to League One following a 3–3 draw in the must win game. After the match, Chansiri confirmed that manager Darren Moore would remain manager for the following season.

On 20 May, it was announced that Liam Dooley would be the new Chief Operating Officer for the club.

On 31 May, it was revealed again that players had still not been paid in full for some months and that there were some players considering walking away over ongoing wages issues.

June
On 25 June, Wednesday announced a new long-term partnership with Italian sportswear provider Macron, commencing from 1 July 2021.

Also on 25 June, Adriano Basso was appointed the new first team goalkeeper coach.

On 28 June, their 2021/22 pre-season officially began with a 10-day training camp in Wales.

Pre-season
As of 21 August, Wednesday announced one pre-season friendly against Leicester City.

Competitions

Championship

League table

Results summary

Results by matchday

Matches
On Friday, 21 August 2020, the EFL Championship fixtures were revealed.

FA Cup

The third round draw was made on 30 November, with Premier League and EFL Championship clubs all entering the competition. The draw for the fourth and fifth round were made on 11 January, conducted by Peter Crouch.

EFL Cup

The first round draw was made on 18 August, live on Sky Sports, by Paul Merson. The draw for both the second and third round were confirmed on September 6, live on Sky Sports by Phil Babb.

Transfers and contracts

Transfers in

Transfers out

Loans in

New contracts

Squad statistics

Appearances

4

|-
|colspan="12" style="text-align:center;" |No longer at the club

|}

Goalscorers

Includes all competitive matches.

Disciplinary record

Clean sheets

Awards

Player of the Month
Player of the Month awards for the 2020–21 season.

Player of the Year
Player of the Year award for the 2020–21 season.

References

Sheffield Wednesday
Sheffield Wednesday F.C. seasons